La Capresse des Colonies is a mid-19th century sculpture by French sculptor Charles-Henri-Joseph Cordier. Sculpted from Algerian marble and adorned with bronze and onyx, using polychromy, the statue was crafted in the years following the 1848 emancipation of slaves in the French Empire, an edict which greatly inspired Cordier. It is part of a pair with The Jewish Woman of Algiers. Both sculptures are in the collection of the Metropolitan Museum of Art.

References 

1861 sculptures
Sculptures of the Metropolitan Museum of Art